Eupithecia achyrdaghica is a moth in the family Geometridae first described by Eugen Wehrli in 1929.  It is found in Turkey and Syria.

Wehrli gave a wingspan of 16–17 mm. He described the forewings as a light, whitish grey marked with fine black dotting and interrupted black lines and the hindwings as similar but with a somewhat brighter costa.

References

Moths described in 1929
achyrdaghica
Moths of Asia
Moths of the Middle East